Terry Lee Hankins (October 10, 1974 – June 2, 2009) was an American serial killer who killed five family members in Mansfield, Texas between October 2000 and August 2001. After fully admitting responsibility, he was convicted of two of the murders and was sentenced to death. Hankins was executed by lethal injection on June 2, 2009, becoming the 200th inmate executed in Texas under the governorship of Rick Perry.

Early life 
Terry Lee Hankins was born on October 10, 1974. When he was young, his parents divorced and he was sent to live with his father Ernie. Hankins was introduced to two stepmothers, both of whom he later claimed sexually abused him. At age 18, he married Tammy Bryce, and he moved in with her three children.

Murders 
On October 1, 2000, Hankins struck 20-year-old half-sister Pearl Sevenstar over the head multiple times with a car jack, killing her. Afterwards he wrapped her body in a plastic sheet, and stuffed it into the front seat of a car at his father's automotive shop. 

A week later, on October 8, Hankins got into an argument with his father Ernie, during which Ernie brandished a .45-caliber pistol. Terry confronted his father and grabbed hold of the gun and shot his father in the head. He later hid the body in an Arlington mobile home, and subsequently took over his father's company and changed its name; he was able to convince neighbors and workers that his father was caring for sick relatives.

To cover up his father's disappearance, he began to regularly pay his father's house bills, and would regularly check in and out of his property. In July 2001, Terry was arrested and charged with aggravated assault for beating his roommate Ruthie Bradley. After a short time in jail, he was released the following month. 

On August 26, Hankins entered his wife's trailer with a gun. Upon locating his sleeping wife, he shot her once in the head. The next day, he fatally shot his sleeping stepchildren Kevin Galley, 12; and Ashley Mason, 11.

Arrest and trial 
Hankins was considered the prime suspect in the murders of Tammy and her children, and a warrant was put out for his arrest. Now wanted, Hankins fled to his girlfriend's apartment in Arlington. However, police eventually tracked him down, and after a five-hour standoff he surrendered without incident. Soon after his arrest, he confessed to the murders as well as to killing his father and stepsister. He told investigators where to look and their bodies were soon recovered. The confession came as a surprise to detectives since neither Hankins' father nor stepsister had ever been reported missing. Initially, he was charged with killing his step children, but not the other three. Despite his confession, he pleaded not guilty, claiming the warrant that lead to his arrest was obtained through illegal means since the evidence that was presented was largely just speculation. Hankins was found guilty of two counts of capital murder, and in May 2002 he was sentenced to death.

Execution 
In January 2009, with his execution date fast approaching, his lawyers attempted to get the Supreme Court to review the case, but the request was denied On June 2, 2009, Hankins was executed via lethal injection at the Huntsville Unit. His last words were "I am sorry for what I've done and for all the pain and suffering my actions have caused. Jesus is Lord. All Glory to God." He was the 200th executed inmate in Texas under Texas governor Rick Perry, and the 439th execution since capital punishment was reinstated in the United States in 1977.

Hankins was buried at Captain Joe Byrd Cemetery.

See also 
 Capital punishment in Texas
 Capital punishment in the United States
 List of people executed in Texas, 2000–2009
 List of people executed in the United States in 2009
 List of serial killers in the United States

References

External links 
 Death Row Information

1974 births
2000 murders in the United States
2001 murders in the United States
2009 deaths
21st-century American criminals
21st-century executions by Texas
21st-century executions of American people
American male criminals
Executed American serial killers
Male serial killers
Patricides
People executed by Texas by lethal injection
Uxoricides